The 1983 Florida Federal Open was a women's tennis tournament played on outdoor hard courts at the Innisbrook Resort and Golf Club in Tampa, Florida in the United States that was part of the 1983 Virginia Slims World Championship Series. It was the 11th edition of the tournament and was held from October 10 through October 16, 1983. First-seeded Martina Navratilova won the singles title and earned $28,000 first-prize money.

Finals

Singles
 Martina Navratilova defeated  Pam Shriver 6–3, 6–2
 It was Navratilova's 13th singles title of the year and the 83rd of her career.

Doubles
 Martina Navratilova /  Pam Shriver defeated  Bonnie Gadusek /  Wendy White-Prausa 6–0, 6–1
 It was Navratilova's 23rd title of the year and the 175th of her career. It was Shriver's 12th title of the year and the 46th of her career.

Prize money

References

External links
 International Tennis Federation (ITF) tournament edition details

Eckerd Open
Florida Federal Open
Florida Federal Open
20th century in Tampa, Florida
Sports competitions in Tampa, Florida
Florida Federal Open
Florida Federal Open